William Snowden (born 27 September 1952) is an English former cricketer.

Snowden was born in September 1952 at Whiston, Lancashire. He was educated at Merchant Taylors' School, Crosby, before going up to Emmanuel College, Cambridge. While studying at Cambridge, he made his debut in first-class cricket for Cambridge University against Leicestershire at Fenner's in 1972. He played first-class cricket for Cambridge until 1975, making 35 appearances. Playing as a batsman, he scored 1,315 runs in his 35 first-class matches for Cambridge, at an average of 21.20 and a high score of 108 not out. This score, one of three centuries he made, came against Kent in 1973. He also made two first-class appearances for the combined Oxford and Cambridge Universities cricket team, playing against the touring New Zealanders in 1973, and the touring Indians in 1974. In addition to playing first-class cricket while at Cambridge, he also made ten appearances in List A one-day cricket. The first eight of these came for Cambridge University, with four appearances apiece in the 1972 and 1974 Benson & Hedges Cup, with Snowden scoring 88 runs with a high score of 44. He also made two List A appearances for the Combined Universities cricket team in the 1975 Benson & Hedges Cup. After graduating from Cambridge he became a schoolteacher, teaching geography at Harrow School from 1981–2014.

References

External links

1952 births
Living people
People from Whiston, Merseyside
People educated at Merchant Taylors' Boys' School, Crosby
Alumni of Emmanuel College, Cambridge
English cricketers
Cambridge University cricketers
Oxford and Cambridge Universities cricketers
British Universities cricketers
Schoolteachers from Merseyside